Juozas Kaminskas  (1898–1957) was a Lithuanian painter.

See also
List of Lithuanian painters

References

1898 births
1957 deaths
20th-century Lithuanian painters